Golden oak, Quercus alnifolia, is a species of oak tree.

Golden oak may also refer to:

Golden Oak at Walt Disney World Resort, Florida
Golden Oak Ranch, California